The following is a list of the world's largest airports by international passenger traffic.

2021 statistics
Airports Council International's preliminary figures are as follows.

2020 statistics
Airports Council International's preliminary figures are as follows.

2019 statistics
Airports Council International's (January–December) preliminary figures are as follows.

2018 statistics
Airports Council International's (January–December) preliminary figures are as follows.

2017 statistics
Airports Council International's (January–December) preliminary figures are as follows.

2016 statistics 
Airports Council International's (January–December) preliminary figures are as follows.

2015 statistics
Airports Council International's (January–December) figures are as follows.

2014 statistics
Airports Council International's (January–December) figures are as follows.

2013 statistics
Airports Council International's (January–December) figures are as follows.

2011 statistics
Airports Council International's (January–December) figures are as follows.

See also

List of busiest airports by passenger traffic
List of busiest airports by cargo traffic
List of busiest airports by aircraft movements
List of international airports by country
Airport of entry

Notes

References
International Passenger Traffic, Airports Council International

Busiest airports by international passenger traffic
 International
Busiest airports